The Ambassador of Canada to the European Union is the head of the Mission of Canada to the European Union, which represents Canada and its interests in the European Union.

Description 
With offices at Avenue des Arts 58 in Brussels, Belgium (like the Canadian embassy), the mission employs representatives from Global Affairs Canada, Agriculture and Agri-Food Canada, Immigration, Refugees and Citizenship Canada, the Canada Border Services Agency, the Canadian Food Inspection Agency and the Department of Justice.

It used to include the European Economic Community, the European Atomic Energy Community, and the European Coal and Steel Community. On December 29, 1959, Cabinet decided to seek the agreement of the three bodies to have Sydney David Pierce accredited to them at the ambassadorial level. Pierce was already Canada's Ambassador to Belgium.

Ambassadors
List of Canadian ambassadors to the European Union with the rank and status of Head of Mission:

References

External links
 Official website

European Union

Canada